Torrens may refer to:

Places

South Australia
 Electoral district of Torrens, a state electoral district
 Lake Torrens, a salt lake north of Adelaide
 River Torrens, which runs through the heart of Adelaide
 Torrens Building, a heritage-listed government office building in the Adelaide city centre
 Torrens Island (disambiguation), places associated with Torrens Island northwest of the Adelaide city centre
 Torrens Linear Park, from the hills to the coast along the course of the River Torrens
 Torrens Road, Adelaide
 Torrens (biogeographic subregion), see Interim Biogeographic Regionalisation for Australia

Australia Capital Territory
 Torrens, Australian Capital Territory, a suburb of Canberra

Other places
 Torréns Bridge, a bridge over the Rosario River in Hormigueros municipality, Puerto Rico

People
 Torrens (surname), a list of people
 Torrens Knight (born 1969), Ulster loyalist and alleged police informer

Other uses
 , two ships and a shore base of the Royal Australian Navy
 Torrens (clipper ship) (1875–1910)
 Torrens Transit, a bus company providing public transport in Adelaide, South Australia
 Torrens Connect, an Australian company that  is owned by the above company
 Torrens University Australia, a for-profit university in South Australia

See also
 Torrens Act (disambiguation)
 Torrens Parade Ground, a former military installation in South Australia
 Torrens title, a system of land title first introduced by Sir Robert Torrens